Jovan Marić (Serbian Cyrillic: 11 August 1941) is a Serbian psychiatrist, author, Doctor of Medical Sciences and former university professor at the Faculty of Medicine in Belgrade.

Marić lectured forensic psychiatry in Faculty of Law in Belgrade, provided psychiatric expertise in court, and served as an ambassador to Nigeria from 2014 until 2016, when he was dismissed following the negative publicity from tabloid media.

Early life and education 
Born in Bijeljina, Marić graduated from musical secondary school, his instrument of choice was piano, and he was also the town's chess champion.

Upon graduating from the secondary school, Marić moved to Belgrade and finished the Medical School there, later pursuing his doctoral degree at that university.

References

External links 
 Jovan Marić  at Poznati.info 
 Marić's Interview at the Politika website

1941 births
Living people
People from Bijeljina
Serbs of Bosnia and Herzegovina
Physicians from Belgrade
Forensic psychiatrists
Serbian psychiatrists
Serbian people in health professions
Sexologists